Shannon Ashley Garcia "Shay" Mitchell (born April 10, 1987) is a Canadian actress and model. She rose to prominence for her role as Emily Fields in the mystery thriller drama series Pretty Little Liars (2010–2017), which earned her nominations for a People's Choice Award and six Teen Choice Awards. She has garnered wider recognition for starring as Peach Salinger in the psychological thriller series You (2018) and as Stella Cole in the Hulu comedy series Dollface (2019–2022). She currently voices Alexandra Trese in the Netflix animated series Trese (2021–present).

After appearing in a series of short films, Mitchell made her feature film debut starring as Nicole in the musical drama film Dreamland (2016). She went on to appear as Tina in the comedy film Mother's Day (2016), and headline the horror film The Possession of Hannah Grace (2018) as Megan Reed. Aside from her acting, she is recognized for her media image and activism. In 2014, Esquire magazine dubbed Mitchell the "Sexiest Woman Alive", and in 2015 she appeared on the Maxim Hot 100 list.

Early life
Mitchell was born in Mississauga, Ontario, the daughter of Precious Garcia and Mark Mitchell. Her father is of Scottish and Irish descent and her mother, who is Filipina, is from the province of Pampanga, and left the Philippines at age 19. She is a first cousin-once removed of Lea Salonga, a singer and musical theater actress. She attended Rockridge Secondary School and then later transferred to West Vancouver Secondary School where she graduated. By her late teens, Mitchell had successfully modelled for a variety of companies in cities as varied as Bangkok, Hong Kong and Barcelona, eventually returning to Toronto to study acting.

Career

2009–2015: Early work and Pretty Little Liars

Mitchell began acting in 2009, making cameo appearances on the Canadian teen drama series Degrassi: The Next Generation and the police drama series Rookie Blue. Also in 2009, she appeared in the music video for "Hold My Hand" by Jamaican rapper Sean Paul.

Mitchell was cast as Emily Fields in the Freeform series Pretty Little Liars, an adaptation of the book series of the same name. She initially auditioned for the character Spencer Hastings, for which she was rejected and the part was instead given to Troian Bellisario; thereafter she tried for Emily Fields and was cast in the role. On portraying Fields, she wrote: "I think for me, it's one of the best characters that I may ever play because of the [impact] she had on so many different people. So I'm very fortunate I was able to be the one to bring Emily to life." Pretty Little Liars opened to positive reviews, and obtained a cult following. Mitchell garnered widespread recognition and praise for her performance, with many lauding the characterization she applied to the role. She earned several accolades for her acting, including winning a Young Hollywood Award in 2011, earning a nomination for a People's Choice Award and receiving six nominations from the Teen Choice Awards. The role additionally established her as a sex symbol. In 2014, she was named the "Sexiest Women Alive" by Esquire magazine, and in 2015, she was included on the Maxim Hot 100 list.

In 2010, Mitchell appeared in a four-episode arc on the Disney XD series Aaron Stone, as Irina Webber. In 2011, she signed a contract with Procter & Gamble to be the spokesperson for the Pantene Nature Fusion shampoo line. In the same year, Mitchell created a YouTube channel, where she is best known for her lifestyle-type videos. In 2012, Mitchell made a publicized cameo on the musical drama series Glee, where she drew comparisons to actress Naya Rivera. In this period, Mitchell frequently took on fewer roles to focus on Pretty Little Liars; these were mostly roles in short films. In 2015, Mitchell co-authored the young adult novel Bliss with Michaela Blaney, which is her writing debut. HelloGiggles reviewed the book, writing that "It's definitely a must-read, and we couldn't be more excited for Mitchell and Blaney."

2016–present: You, Dollface, film roles and other ventures 
In 2016, Mitchell made her feature film debut with the musical drama film Dreamland, starring as Nicole, which premiered at the Tribeca Film Festival. That same year, she headlined the comedy film Mother's Day, where she played Tina. The film was a moderate commercial success, and marked Mitchell's film breakthrough, though it was panned by critics. 

In 2018, Mitchell was cast in the former Lifetime television thriller series You, in the role of Peach Salinger, a wealthy and powerful socialite, which she played in the shows' first season. The series premiered in September 2018, and received critical acclaim. It earned spots in several critic year-end lists, and the performances of the ensemble cast, including Mitchell, were praised; it is her highest-rated work. Also in 2018, Mitchell founded the production company Amore & Vita Inc. and signed a contract with Warner Bros. Television. She was subsequently cast in the ABC television pilot The Heiresses, adapted from the book of the same name, which was in production until 2018, when it was announced that the show was cancelled.

Mitchell also launched her travel brand, BÉIS in 2018. The same year, the horror film The Possession of Hannah Grace was released, where Mitchell was seen as Megan Reed, a "troubled ex-cop who takes the graveyard shift in a morgue". The project was filmed years prior, and she stated that it has been one of her more difficult roles to play. She stated in an interview with Collider: "I was playing a character who was dealing with major anxiety, and to be honest with you, before this role, I hadn't really encountered anxiety in my personal life. Getting this role and being in Boston and shooting it, right after coming off of PLL, to then leading this film, there was a lot of pressure. ... I had so many panic attacks, in those first three weeks of shooting, and it was only a four-week shoot. I feel like I was truly feeling what I think that character must have been going through." Upon release, it garnered a negative reception from critics, though Mitchell's performance was praised and the film was a commercial success.

Since November 2019, Mitchell has portrayed Stella Cole in the Hulu comedy series Dollface, the best friend to Jules Wiley (Kat Dennings). The character initially drew comparisons to Mitchell's Peach Salinger on You, though she stated on the role that "Aesthetically, you can see a similarity but when you get to know Stella, she's really a wild spirit and a complete 180 from Peach. It was fun to go from that to this." Dollface is her first leading comedy role, and Mitchell, along with the acting ensemble, earned praise. She made her voice acting debut in the 2021 Netflix animated series Trese, where she provided the voice of the titular protagonist, Alexandra Trese.

Personal life

Mitchell supported Somaly Mam Foundation, a non-profit organization that fought sex trafficking, until it ended operations in 2014. She has also worked with The Trevor Project alongside the Pretty Little Liars cast and the NOH8 Campaign. She works with the WE Charity, which helps communities develop educational resources, and she partnered with Represent Clothing to promote tees where half the proceeds went to GLAAD.

On her sexuality, Mitchell has stated that she prefers not to label it. In a 2017 interview with Maxim magazine, she said that "People always ask me, 'You play a gay character? Are you gay? Are you straight? Are you this? Are you that?' Look, Emily doesn't label herself, and I don't label myself either. I fall in love with the spirit of somebody. Love is love, and that's something that I'll keep saying."

Mitchell has been in a relationship with Matte Babel since 2017. The couple have two daughters, born in October 2019 and May 2022.

Filmography

Film

Television

Music videos

Awards and nominations

Publications
 Bliss (October 6, 2015) (co-written with Michaela Blaney)

References

External links

 

1987 births
Living people
21st-century Canadian actresses
Actresses from Ontario
Canadian expatriate actresses in the United States
Female models from Ontario
Canadian film actresses
Canadian actresses of Filipino descent
Canadian people of Irish descent
Canadian people of Scottish descent
Canadian television actresses
People from Mississauga
Shorty Award winners
Canadian LGBT rights activists